Zhou Yulin (12 February 1923 – 2 March 2021) was a Chinese mathematician and academic of the Chinese Academy of Sciences.

Biography
Zhou was born in Shanghai, on 12 February 1923, while his ancestral home was in Zhenhai, Zhejiang. In 1941, he was admitted to Utopia University, where he majored in mathematics. After graduating in October 1945, he became an assistant at Nanjing Temporary University and one year later was transferred to the Institute of Mathematics, Academia Sinica as an assistant. In October 1949, he joined the faculty of Peking University. After studying Russian in Beijing Russian College for several months, he was sent to study at Moscow State University on government scholarships. He returned to China in August 1957 and continued to teach at Peking University. In 1960, he was transferred to the Beijing No.9 Research Institute, the Second Machinery Industry (now China Academy of Engineering Physics). On 2 March 2021, he died of illness in Beijing, aged 98.

Contributions
He contributed to the mathematical simulation and physical processes of China's nuclear weapons.

Works

Honours and awards
 1982 State Natural Science Award (First Class)
 1985 State Science and Technology Progress Award (Special)
 1991 Member of the Chinese Academy of Sciences (CAS)
 1996 Science and Technology Progress Award of the Ho Leung Ho Lee Foundation
 1997 Hua Luogeng Mathematics Prize
 2006 Su Buqing Applied Mathematics Prize (Special)

References

Further reading

1923 births
2021 deaths
Mathematicians from Shanghai
Utopia University alumni
Moscow State University alumni
Academic staff of Peking University
Members of the Chinese Academy of Sciences